Churchill Falls  is a community in the province of Newfoundland and Labrador, Canada. It is home to the Churchill Falls Generating Station and is a company town.

History
John McLean is believed to have been the first European to see the falls in 1839. In 1967, work on the generating station had commenced, officially inaugurated by Premier Joey Smallwood, while residential facilities also began that year. The town was built around a town complex, the Donald Gordon Centre, with amenities such as a school, gymnasium, grocery store, hotel, restaurant, library, curling club and swimming pool. Permanent housing facilities were constructed in 1969. The town is managed and operated by Nalcor Energy and remains a company town to this date.

Transportation 
Churchill Falls is connected by the Trans-Labrador Highway with Labrador City and Baie-Comeau in Quebec, its main transportation link.

The Churchill Falls Airport has served the community as a privately-owned airport since 1971. There is no formal terminal building, just a few small structures and the runway. There were scheduled flights to Goose Bay and Wabush in the 1970s, and scheduled service by PAL Airlines (formerly Provincial Airlines) up to 2003.

Geography
Churchill Falls lies on the Churchill River near the Churchill Falls, one of the largest waterfalls in Canada.

Climate
Under the Köppen climate classification, Churchill Falls has a subarctic climate (Dfc) with long, cold winters and short, mild summers.

Demographics

Churchill Falls is a part of the Division No. 10, Subdivision D. As of the 2021 census, it had a population of 732. There were a total of 556 private dwellings. The population was spread out, with 175 being from age 0 to 14, 535 from age 15 to 64, and 20 being age 65 or older. The average age was 34.0. English was the mother tongue of 705 residents, while French was the mother tongue of the remaining 15. A total of 60 residents claimed to be of First Nations heritage, while 40 were Métis.

Sports and recreation
The Terry Smith Memorial Arena, named after a longtime resident, is one of the most popular facilities in town. The Churchill Falls Gymnasium serves the needs of the Eric G. Lambert School as well as badminton and hockey teams. The curling club is based at the Donald Gordon Center. There are also soccer fields and a swimming pool in the community.

See also
 Churchill Falls
 Churchill Falls Generating Station
 Lower Churchill Project
 List of cities and towns in Newfoundland and Labrador

References

External links

Populated places in Labrador
Populated places established in 1967